The 2013 Girl's Africa Volleyball Championship happens in Egypt, from 25 to 27 March. The top three finishers qualify for the 2013 FIVB Girls Youth World Championship.

First round
Venue: Army Club Hall, Cairo, Egypt

Classifications

Individual awards

Most Valuable Player

Best Spiker

Best Blocker

Best Server

Best Setter

Best Receiver

Best Libero

External links
http://www.fivb.org/viewPressRelease.asp?No=37702&Language=en

2013 in volleyball